Maury Surel Castillo (also Mauri, Mauris or Maurys; born 19 October 1984) is a Cuban athlete specializing in the 800 and 1500 metres events.

Personal bests
800 metres: 1:44.89 min –  Huelva, 22 June 2012
1500 metres: 3:35.03 min –  Huelva, 7 June 2012
3000 metres: 7:58.3 min (ht) –  Havana 20 June 2009
5000 metres: 14:08.3 min (ht) –  Santa Clara 16 May 2008
Half marathon: 1:07:50 hrs –  Havana 28 January 2008

Indoor
800 metres: 1:47.85 min –  Ghent, 18 February 2012
1500 metres: 3:43.06 min –  Antequera, 19 January 2013
3000 metres: 8:17.10 min –  Antequera, 7 January 2012

Competition record

References

 

1984 births
Living people
Cuban male middle-distance runners
Central American and Caribbean Games medalists in athletics
Competitors at the 2006 Central American and Caribbean Games
Central American and Caribbean Games bronze medalists for Cuba
Athletes (track and field) at the 2007 Pan American Games
Pan American Games competitors for Cuba